Eliphaz Maari (born 1954) is an Anglican bishop who served in Uganda: he was the Assistant Bishop of Kampala from 1997 to 2004.  He was also head of Uganda Christian University.

References

21st-century Anglican bishops in Uganda
Anglican bishops of Kampala
Academic staff of Uganda Christian University
1954 births
Living people